Betageri Krishnasharma (16 April 1900 – 30 October 1982), popularly known by his pen name Anandakanda was a writer, editor and journalist from Karnataka. His writings included different genres such as poetry, short stories, novels, dramas, metaphors, criticism, research, folklore and autobiographies.

He called for the Unification of Karnataka.

Literary works

Novels
 Ashanti Parva (Historical Novel based on Vijayanagara Empire)
 Magala Maduve
 Mallikarjuna (Historical Novel based on Vijayanagara Empire)
 Rajayogi (Historical Novel based on Vijayanagara Empire)
 Sudarshana

Collection of stories
 Badatanada Baalu Namma Baduku
 Janapada Jeevana
 Matanaduva Kallu 
 Samsar Chitra (of total 7)

Review works
 Karnataka Janajeevana
 Namma Samskriti Parampare
 Sahityavu Sagiruva Daari
 Sahitya Vihara

Poems
 Bhakthi Kusumavali (1918)
 Kannada Nudi
 Naavu 
 Odeda Kannadi

Collection of poems
 Arunodaya
 Gandhi Geetasapthaka
 Kaara Hunnime
 Nalwadugalu
 Odanadi
 Rameyumeyara Samvada
 Rashtriya Padhyamale
 Rashtriya Padyavali
 Virahini (1935) (of total 13)

Collection of Vachanas
 Samajika Samvachanagalu (1981)

Awards and honours
  Karnataka Sahitya Academy Award
  Honorary Doctorate from Karnatak University
 Presided the chair of Karnataka Janapada Sammelana

Recognition
 Kannada Pustaka Pradhikara has published a book on Dr. Betageri Krishnasharma that has been authored by Dr. Nijalingappa Mattihal
 Novelist Dr. Raghavendra Patil has authored a biography book named Anandakanda:Betageri Krishna Sharma that has been published by Sahitya Akademi, New Delhi

References

Kannada-language writers
1900 births
1982 deaths
Writers from Karnataka